Live Seeds is the first official live album by Australian post-punk band, Nick Cave and the Bad Seeds. The album was recorded live from 1992 to 1993, at various concerts throughout Europe and Australia, at the touring stage promoting their previous studio album, Henry's Dream. Nick Cave wanted to give the songs a raw feeling as originally intended before production problems occurred. Live Seeds includes a not previously studio-recorded track, "Plain Gold Ring", which is a cover of a song performed by Nina Simone.

Background
Live Seeds was a live album recorded from 1992 to 1993 by Australian post-punk band, Nick Cave and the Bad Seeds at various concerts throughout Europe and Australia. The band had formed in 1983 with a line-up including Nick Cave on lead vocals, Mick Harvey (initially on drums) on guitar, Blixa Bargeld on guitar and Barry Adamson on bass guitar. Soon after the release and subsequent tour for 1988's Tender Prey, Cave began experimenting with piano-driven ballads, resulting in 1990's The Good Son. Seeped in sorrow and longing, the comparatively refined and understated album was well-received critically and commercially, yielding the singles "The Weeping Song" and "The Ship Song".

In 1990 two Australian musicians joined, Martyn Casey (The Triffids) on bass guitar and Conway Savage on keyboards. Their next album, 1992's Henry's Dream, marked a step back to harder rock, utilising producer David Briggs (Neil Young). The album's tour is documented on Live Seeds and showcases the new group's aggressive yet accomplished sound. The live album was produced by the band. Sound engineer and mixer Tony Cohen said that the lead vocals on Jack The Ripper were overdubbed 'live' in the studio in Melbourne before the album was mixed. In mid-1993, Cave relocated to London where Henry's Dreams follow-up studio album, Let Love In, was recorded and released in 1994.

Reception

AllMusic's Ned Raggett review of Live Seeds noted that "some fans consider many of the songs on [this album] to be superior to their studio equivalent – a testament to its overall quality". He felt that "[f]ew cuts differ drastically from the more familiar album versions, but generally everything is crisper, at times much more brusque, perhaps exchanging texture for force".

Track listing

Personnel
Nick Cave and the Bad Seeds 
 Nick Cave – vocals, organ, piano
 Blixa Bargeld – guitar, backing vocals
 Mick Harvey – guitar, xylophone, backing vocals
 Martyn Casey – bass guitar, backing vocals
 Conway Savage – piano, organ, backing vocals
 Thomas Wydler – drums

Additional musicians
 The Cruel Sea – backing vocals

Production details
 Producer – Nick Cave and the Bad Seeds
 Mixer – Bad Seeds, Tony Cohen
 Studios – mixed at Atlantic Studios, Melbourne, Australia in January–February 1993

Art work
 Layout design – Slim Smith
 Photography – Ute Klaphake, Peter Milne

Charts

References

Nick Cave live albums
1993 live albums
Mute Records live albums